Fuji may refer to:

Places

China
 Fuji, Xiangcheng City (付集镇), town in Xiangcheng City, Henan

Japan
 Mount Fuji, the tallest mountain in Japan
 Fuji River
 Fuji, Saga, town in Saga Prefecture
 Fuji, Shizuoka, city in Shizuoka Prefecture
 Fuji Speedway, a major race track at the base of Mt Fuji

People
 Fuji (surname), a Japanese surname
 Mr. Fuji, ring name of American professional wrestler and manager Harry Fujiwara (1934–2016)
 Mr. Fuji, one of many modern monikers of the creator of Fuji musical genre, Ayinde Barrister

Fictional characters
 Fuji (comics), a character in the Stormwatch series

Music
 Mt. Fuji Jazz Festival, a jazz festival in Japan
 Fuji Rock Festival, a rock festival in Japan
 Fuji music, a music genre from Yorubaland of Nigeria

Japanese companies
 Fujifilm, a Japanese company producing cameras and photographic film
 Fuji Heavy Industries, Ltd., the former name of Subaru Corporation, a Japanese company producing industrial products
 Fuji TV, a Japanese television network
 Fuji Electric, a Japanese company producing electric products
 Fujitec, a Japanese company producing escalators and elevators
 Fujitsu, a computer company based in Japan
 Fuji Advanced Sports Inc., a U.S. distributor of bicycles made in Taiwan and the People's Republic of China
 Fuji Bank, a major bank in Japan which existed until 2002, now part of Mizuho Financial Group
 Fuji Iron & Steel, a steel company that existed from 1950 until its merger with Yawata Iron & Steel in 1970

Other
 Ellipse Fuji, a French hang glider
 Fuji , Japanese name of Wisteria floribunda (Japanese wisteria)
 Fuji (apple), a cultivar of apple
 Fuji (film), a 1975 film by Robert Breer
 Fuji, the name of the three-pronged Atari logo
 Japanese ship Fuji
 Japanese battleship Fuji, a late 19th-century Japanese battleship
 Fuji (train), a passenger train in Japan
 Fuji (spacecraft), a capsule type crewed spacecraft concept, proposed by NASDA
 Fuji (planchette writing), a traditional Chinese method for automatic writing
 Fuji University, a private university in Hanamaki, Iwate, Japan
 Fuji Women's University, a private university in Sapporo, Hokkaido, Japan

See also

 
 
 Fiji (disambiguation)
 Fujian
 Fujii